Joseph Magliano (1968/1969 – October 2006), better known by the ring name "Jumping" Joey Maggs, was an American professional wrestler. He was best known for his appearances with World Championship Wrestling (WCW) from 1991 to 1998.

Professional wrestling career

Early career (1987–1990)
In 1987, Magliano made his professional debut in Deep South Wrestling (later Southern Championship Wrestling), eventually winning the promotion's Southern Heavyweight Championship twice. Under the ring names Magnificent Magliano and "Hotshot" Joey Knight, and while teaming with Ricky Lawless as The Heavy Metal Connection, Magliano competed for promotions in Mississippi and Louisiana before eventually finding success in the Memphis-based United States Wrestling Association during the early 1990s.

United States Wrestling Association (1990–1991)
Making his debut in mid-1990, Magliano scored victories over John Tatum and Ken Wayne, before teaming with Rex King to win the USWA Tag Team Titles from the Dirty White Boys (Tony Anthony and Tom Burton) in Memphis on June 23, 1990. Winning a battle royal on June 25, he also defeated Johnny Hotbody, Tom Burton, and The Galaxian (either Dan Marsh or Daniel Briley) in single matches while teaming with King.

Successfully defending the tag team titles against the Dirty White Boys (Scott Braddock and Jeff Gaylord), they lost the titles to Brian Lee and Don Harris on August 11. Losing to Brickhouse Brown and Reggie B. Fine two days later, Magliano and King began wrestling single matches, although Magliano suffered losses to Ken Wayne and King Cobra in the next few weeks.

Teaming once more with King, Magliano would lose to Doug Gilbert and The New York Brawler on September 10 before returning to a singles career. Losing to Doug Gilbert, MC Jammer, and Danny Davis in late 1990, he would begin teaming with Sheik Fabiano, losing to Brian Christopher and Tony Williams, although he would defeat them in a rematch with Ken Wayne on November 26.

During his last months in the promotion, he would briefly hold the USWA Junior Heavyweight Championship, defeating Danny Davis for the title on December 26 before losing it back to him days later on January 6, 1992.

World Championship Wrestling (1988–1998)
Made his debut for WCW in November 1988. Returned in January 1991, he made his debut as "Jumping" Joey Maggs in World Championship Wrestling (WCW), losing to Tom Zenk in Dothan, Alabama and, less than a month after his debut, appeared on Clash of the Champions XIV, losing to Sid Vicious on January 30, 1991.

Facing "Stunning" Steve Austin in a match for the WCW World Television Championship at Clash of the Champions XV in Knoxville, Tennessee on June 12, he would also lose to Thomas Rich of The York Foundation at Clash of the Champions XVI in Augusta, Georgia on August 5.

That same month, Magliano entered the WCW Light Heavyweight Championship Tournament, losing to Badstreet in the opening rounds on August 31. He would also team with Johnny Rich as The Creatures, a masked tag team which appeared at Halloween Havoc that year, losing to Big Josh and P. N. News on October 27, 1991. The next year, although defeating Buddy Lee Parker on January 31, he would lose matches to Big Josh and Tommy Rich before leaving the promotion for a short time.

During a brief stint in Smokey Mountain Wrestling in early 1992, he and former rival Danny Davis participated in an eight-team tag team championship tournament for the vacant SMW Tag Team Championship on April 23, scoring an upset victory over Ivan and Vladimir Koloff in the opening rounds before being eliminated by the Heavenly Bodies in the semi-finals. The following month, he and Hector Guerrero defeated Rip Rogers and Barry Horowitz at the supercard Volunteer Slam I on May 22, 1992. He would also make occasional appearances in WCW during the summer, facing Tom Zenk on May 30 and teaming with The Italian Stallion against Arn Anderson and Bobby Eaton on August 16. 

Magliano faced The Tasmaniac in a dark match on WCW Saturday Night on February 22, 1993. The following week, he and three other wrestlers were attacked by WCW World Heavyweight Champion Big Van Vader while attempting to intervene on behalf of Chris Sullivan after defeating Vader via disqualification.

Teaming with Marcus Alexander Bagwell, the two lost to Shanghai Pierce and Tex Slazinger and The Wrecking Crew (Rage and Fury). They also later lost to Maxx Payne and NWA World Heavyweight Champion Barry Windham in single matches before he and Bagwell broke up, with Magliano losing to his former tag team partner on March 26. Magliano would continue losing matches to Maxx Payne, Chris Benoit, 2 Cold Scorpio, and The Russian Brute during the next several weeks.

He and Bob Starr would later lose to Kent and Keith Cole on May 21 and as he continued losing single matches to Erik Watts and Johnny Gunn. During the next month, he returned to the WWF, making another brief appearance losing to Bam Bam Bigelow at Monday Night Raw on July 5.

Under the management of Teddy Long in early 1996, Magliano would defeat Disco Inferno on January 1 and, less than a week later, would team with Frankie Lancaster and Men at Work, losing to The Four Horsemen (Ric Flair, Arn Anderson, Brian Pillman, and Chris Benoit) in a four-man tag team match on WCW Pro. Briefly feuding with V.K. Wallstreet after being awarded a victory via disqualification on January 27, he later lost to Wallsteet and Big Bubba Rogers in a tag team match with Sgt. Craig Pittman at Superbrawl VI on February 11, although he would defeat Wallstreet in a rematch the following month.

Although regularly appearing on WCW Saturday Night and WCW Worldwide during the 1990s, Magliano would begin competing part-time in various independent promotions, including the Mid-Eastern Wrestling Federation, where he defeated Quinn Nash for the MEWF Mid-Atlantic Championship on September 17, 1997. Wrestling less frequently during the late 1990s, he lost to Psychosis in one of his final appearances on December 27, 1997.
His last appearance was against Bill Goldberg on February 14, 1998.

World Wrestling Federation (1992–1994) 
He also appeared for the World Wrestling Federation in 1992, facing Rick "The Model" Martel and Yokozuna on WWF Prime Time Wrestling later that year. During early 1993, Magliano teamed with Jim Powers at WWF house shows, losing to The Beverly Brothers on February 16. Wrestled his last WWF match against Duke Droese WWF Wrestling Challenge on May 24, 1994.

Retirement
Magliano retired from professional wrestling in 1998 due to a nagging shoulder injury. He moved back to Maryland, where he enrolled in flight school to become a cargo pilot.

Death
In October 2006, Magliano died at the age of 37.

Championships and accomplishments
Mid-Eastern Wrestling Federation
MEWF Mid-Atlantic Championship (1 time)
Pro Wrestling Illustrated
PWI ranked him # 337 of the 500 best singles wrestlers of the PWI 500 in 1991.
Southern Championship Wrestling (Buck Robley)
SCW Southern Heavyweight Championship (2 times)
Southern Championship Wrestling (Jerry Blackwell)
SCW Tag Team Championship (2 times) - with Tommy Rich (1) and Ranger Ross (1) 
United States Wrestling Association
USWA Junior Heavyweight Championship (1 time)
USWA World Tag Team Championship (1 time) – with Rex King

See also
 List of premature professional wrestling deaths

References

External links

2006 deaths
American male professional wrestlers
American professional wrestlers of Italian descent
Professional wrestlers from Maryland
Sportspeople from Baltimore
20th-century professional wrestlers
USWA World Tag Team Champions